The Rathdrum Prairie is a flat in the U.S. state of Idaho. The prairie contains the cities of Coeur d'Alene, Post Falls, Hayden, Rathdrum, State Line, and Huetter. The prairie also contains part of the Spokane Valley–Rathdrum Prairie Aquifer.

See also
 Spokane Valley

References

Coeur d'Alene, Idaho
Prairies
Landforms of Kootenai County, Idaho